The Anatomy of Criticism: A Trialogue (1933) is a book by Henry Hazlitt on literary criticism.

External links
The Anatomy of Criticism 

1933 non-fiction books
Literature about literature
Books of literary criticism
Books by Henry Hazlitt